Sundai may refer to:
 Sundai Preparatory School
 Sundai Michigan International Academy
 Sundai Ireland International School